Rúben Filipe Quintano Silvestre (born 21 January 1994) is a Portuguese footballer who plays as a forward.

Club career
He made his professional debut in the Segunda Liga for Tondela on 12 January 2014 in a game against Sporting Covilhã.

References

External links

1994 births
Living people
Portuguese footballers
Association football forwards
C.D. Tondela players
Liga Portugal 2 players
Segunda Divisão players
G.D. Tourizense players
Sertanense F.C. players
G.D. Gafanha players
ASC Oțelul Galați players
Anadia F.C. players
SC São João de Ver players
Portuguese expatriate footballers
Expatriate footballers in Romania
Portuguese expatriate sportspeople in Romania
Sportspeople from Viseu District